OGT may refer to:

Ohio Graduation Test, a statewide exit test as a result of the No Child Left Behind Act
Original Gangster Tool, someone who claims to have been a fan of rock/metal band Tool since the beginning (from the time of the release of the Opiate EP in 1992); term appears in Tool's 1996 song "Hooker with a Penis"
OG: Original Gangster (Original Gangster Thug), a 1991 album by Ice-T
Protein O-GlcNAc transferase, a human enzyme that catalyzes installation of the O-GlcNAc post-translational modification
Ogt, O6-alkylguanine DNA alkyltransferase II, a protein also known as AGT II